AIMA can refer to:

 AIMA prophecy on the Komnenian family in the Byzantine Empire
 All India Management Association
 Artificial Intelligence: A Modern Approach, standard university textbook on Artificial Intelligence
 Australian Institute of Multicultural Affairs, an Australian government agency from 1979 to 1986